Khadra is a name of Arabic origin which is used as a surname and a feminine given name. Notable people with the name include:

Surname
 Aida El-Khadra, American particle physicist
 Hatem Abu Khadra (born 1990), Palestinian Jordanian football player
 Pierre Khadra, Lebanese dancer and choreographer
 Reda Khadra (born 2001), German football player
 Salwa Abu Khadra (born 1929), Palestinian politician and educator
 Subhi al-Khadra (1895–1955), Palestinian politician and lawyer

Given name
 Khadra Bashir Ali (died 2021), Somalian politician
 Khadra Dahir Cige(1957–2022), Somalian singer
 Khadra Haji Ismail Geid, Somalian politician
 Al Khadra Mint Mabrook, known as Al Khadra Mabrook (c.1934–2021), Sahrawi poet
 Khadra Hussein Mohammad, Somalian lawyer

Middle name
 Salma Khadra Jayyusi (born 1926/1927), Palestinian poet and anthologist

Other
 Yasmina Khadra, pen name of Mohammed Moulessehoul (born 1955), Algerian writer

Feminine given names
Surnames of Lebanese origin
Surnames of Palestinian origin